Chris Kramer (born May 14, 1975) is a Canadian actor. He is best known for the starring role of Morgan Pym, in the Citytv television show The Collector.

Biography
Kramer was born in Regina, Saskatchewan.  He lived in different cities in Canada before settling in Calgary with his family. When he was 21, he dropped out of college and moved to Vancouver. He got his big break when he was cast in the lead role of Morgan Pym in 'The Collector.' He is best known for his roles on '24,' 'Saving Grace,' 'The Collector,' and 'Jericho.' He is a two time Leo Award and Monte Carlo Television Festival Nominee.

References

External links

A Fan Site

1975 births
Living people
Canadian male television actors
Male actors from Regina, Saskatchewan
Canadian Roman Catholics
Canadian people of German descent
Canadian people of Swedish descent